Tu Chor Main Sipahi (English:You the burglar, me the soldier) is a 1996 Indian action film starring Akshay Kumar, Saif Ali Khan, Tabu and Pratibha Sinha. It was released on 10 May 1996 and was directed by Guddu Dhanoa. The screenplay was written by Robin Henry.

Plot
Raja aka King (Saif Ali Khan) is a notorious criminal mainly robbing well to do people. Inspector Amar (Akshay Kumar) is a macho police officer tracking him and willing to do anything to catch him. The Mumbai police wants King to be arrested at any cost. Things become worse for Amar when King robs the commissioner's house. Commissioner Kushal Singh (Anupam Kher) presses Amar to arrest King within four days or get ready to get transferred to Tandarikala, a remote location which is also called as the graveyard of the policemen, as no policeman came back alive after going there.

Amar is almost successful in arresting King but on their way back, Amar becomes injured in an incident involved with local bandits and King takes advantage of this situation and ditches Amar in the middle of the road and himself goes to Tandarikala, posing as a fake inspector. When Raja aka King reaches Tandarikala, he learns that the village is ruled by a merciless ruler, Thakur Gajendra Singh (Amrish Puri). Thakur keeps all old men alive but abducts young men to work for him.

In Tandarikala, Raja is surprised to see Guddu, a village simpleton, who is a look alike of Amar. It is later revealed that Guddu is actually Inspector Amar who followed Raja to arrest him but after seeing the condition of the villagers by the hands of Thakur, he changes his mind and together with Raja, decides to eliminate the cruelty of thakur from the village.

In the end, they succeed by killing the Thakur and his goons and in the ending scene, it is shown that Amar handcuffs Raja and they both share a laugh together.

Cast
Akshay Kumar as Inspector Amar Verma/Guddu
Saif Ali Khan as Raja/King
Tabu as Kajal Singh
Pratibha Sinha as Rani
Amrish Puri as Thakur Gajendra Singh
Anupam Kher as Police Commissioner Kushal Singh
Deven Verma as ACP Verma, Amar's dad

Music
Music by Dilip Sen-Sameer Sen.
Lyrics by Anand Bakshi.

Tracks are listed below.

References

External links

1990s Hindi-language films
1996 films
Films scored by Dilip Sen-Sameer Sen
Indian action drama films
Indian heist films
1990s action drama films
1990s heist films
Films directed by Guddu Dhanoa